The Battle of Clastidium was fought in 222 BC between a Roman Republican army led by the Roman consul Marcus Claudius Marcellus and the Insubres, a Celtic people in northern Italy. Florus writes that the Insubres were led by Viridomarus, or Britomartus, as the name varies in translation. The Romans won the battle, and in the process, Marcellus earned the spolia opima, one of the highest honors in ancient Rome, by killing the king in single combat. It was also notable as one of the few battles won by the Roman cavalry without any aid by the legions.

Background
After the successful campaign of consuls Publius Furius Philus and Gaius Flaminius in 223 BC against the Insubres, the latter sent out ambassadors begging for peace to the Roman senate. The new consuls Marcus Claudius Marcellus and Gnaeus Cornelius Scipio Calvus however strongly urged that no peace should be granted to them. On meeting with a refusal, the Insubres decided to fight to the last and hired a force of thirty thousand Gaesatae mercenaries to aid their cause. The Roman consuls, when the war season came, invaded the territory of the Insubres with their legions, and laid siege to the city of Acerrae, nowadays in the area of Pizzighettone, between Cremona and Lodi (south of Milan).

The Insubres could not come to the assistance of the besieged, as the Romans had occupied all the advantageous positions around the city. But with the object of making the latter raise the siege, they crossed the Po with part of their forces, and entering the territory of the Anares, laid siege to a town there called Clastidium. On the consuls learning of this, Marcellus set off in haste with two thirds of his cavalry (about 3,200 men, assuming a full complement of 4,800 equites for two consular armies) and a small body of his fittest infantry to relieve the besieged. He left Gnaeus with most of the army to maintain the siege of Acerrae.

Battle

As soon as they were aware of the enemy's arrival, the Celts raised the siege and advanced to meet them, drawn up in order of battle. In response, Marcellus led his squadrons of cavalry forward and tried to outflank them, extending his wings into a thin line until he was not far from the enemy. His horse was temporarily seized with panic and turned away from the Gallic line, which he could convert into a spectacle of dedication to the Gods. He then vowed that he would consecrate to Jupiter Feretrius the most beautiful suit of armor among them.

Meanwhile, Viridomarus had ridden before his men and issued a challenge for single combat to the Roman consul. Marcellus accepted and promptly galloped at his opponent, unhorsing him on his first pass with his lance. He then dispatched Viridomarus with two more thrusts before dismounting to strip his fallen foe of his beautiful bejeweled armor.

Encouraged, the Roman cavalry charged at the Gallic horse and foot, who at first stood firm but were taken both in the rear and flank and were put to rout. Thousands of Gauls were killed in the pursuit, many drowning in the Po.

Aftermath

Encouraged by the victory the Romans took Acerrae shortly afterward, while the demoralized Gauls retreated to Mediolanum, the largest city of the Insubres.  Gnaeus followed close on their heels, and suddenly appeared before Mediolanum.  The Gauls at first did not stir, but, when he was on his way back to Acerrae, they sallied out, and made a bold attack on his rear, which were only beaten off with difficulty.  Gnaeus, following them, laid waste the country and took Mediolanum itself by assault, upon which the chieftains of the Insubres lost all hope and surrendered unconditionally.  Thus the Romans succeeded in conquering the largest independent Celtic tribe in Italy, and firmly established their hegemony over the Po Valley, then the most productive agricultural region in the peninsula.

See also
 Roman Republican governors of Gaul

References

222 BC
Clastidium
3rd century BC in the Roman Republic
Clastidium 222 BC
Clastidium 222 BC
Clastidium